Magnicourt-en-Comte is a commune in the Pas-de-Calais department in the Hauts-de-France region of France.

Geography

Population

Places of interest
 The church of St.Leger, dating from the twelfth century.
 The remains of an old chateau, destroyed in 1639.
 Watermills

See also
Communes of the Pas-de-Calais department

References

Magnicourtencomte